The 2015–16 season was Coventry City's 132nd season in their history and fourth consecutive season in League One. Along with competing in League One, the club also participated in the FA Cup, the League Cup and the Football League Trophy. The season covered the period from 1 July 2015 to 30 June 2016.

Review and events

July
8 players were released on 1 July 2015 with Al Bangura, Adam Barton, Frank Nouble, Shaun Miller, Simeon Jackson, Andy Webster, Danny Pugh and Blair Turgott all leaving the club. Five players from the academy signed professional contracts on 1 July 2015 as Cian Harries, Devon Kelly-Evans, Dion Kelly-Evans, Ben Stevenson and George Thomas all signing contracts alongside Chris Stokes, who signed a one-year contract on a free transfer from Forest Green Rovers.  On 6 July 2015, Sam Ricketts joined Coventry City on a free transfer signing a one-year deal with the club.  Romain Vincelot signed for the Sky Blues on 8 July 2015. On the same date, Coventry City owners Sisu earned the right to appeal against a Court's decision, which ruled that Coventry City Council's £14.4million loan to the Ricoh Arena operators ACL in 2012 was not state aid with the two-day appeal hearing taking place in February 2016.  Réda Johnson extended his time at Coventry City on 10 July 2015, signing a new one-year deal. On 24 July 2015, Rúben Lameiras signed a contract at the club after a successful trial. Adam Armstrong signed a 6-month loan deal from Newcastle United on 28 July 2015. On 31 July 2015, the club announced that assistant manager Neil MacFarlane left the club by mutual agreement.

August
On 1 August 2015, Coventry City ended their pre-season campaign with a 0–0 draw against Oxford United. They played a total of five games, failing to win a single game after three draws and two losses. A Coventry City XI side also drew 0–0 with Leamington during pre-season. Sam Ricketts was named as captain for the season on 3 August 2015. Bryn Morris was signed on season-long youth loan deal from Middlesbrough on 6 August 2015. Norwich City's Jacob Murphy was signed on loan on 15 August 2015 in a deal which will last till the end of the season. On 18 August, Ivor Lawton was loaned out to Nuneaton Town for one month. The club finished the month in fifth place after winning their first three league games but were defeated by Walsall 2–1 and drew at home to Southend United. Coventry were also knocked out the League Cup when they lost on penalties to Rochdale away from home in the first round. Adam Armstrong was awarded with League One's Player of the month award for August.

September 
Transfer deadline day saw Danny Swanson and Kyle Spence leave the club with just one player coming the other way as Lateef Elford-Alliyu signed a four-month contract with the Sky Blues. Marc-Antoine Fortuné signed for Coventry City on a free transfer, signing on 4 September. Ryan Kent became Coventry's fourth loan signing of the season on 10 September, arriving from Liverpool. Adam Jackson signed on loan for the club on 14 September from Middlesbrough. The Sky Blues finished the month in fourth place after two wins and two defeats, beating Burton Albion and Chesterfield but losing to Scunthorpe United and Bury.

October 
Former England-International midfielder Joe Cole was signed by Tony Mowbray on 16 October, signing for 35 days with the club. George Thomas was loaned out to Yeovil Town on 24 October until 21 November. On 24 October, Reice Charles-Cook broke a post-war club record as he went 578 minutes without conceding a goal overtaking Steve Ogrizovic's 572 minutes without conceding. Coventry City were in fourth place by the end of the month without losing a game in the league winning three of the six fixtures. However, they were knocked out the Football League Trophy in the second round by League Two side Yeovil Town on penalties after drawing the game 0–0.

November 
Steve Waggott left his position at the club as chief executive on 5 November. This was followed by the appointment of Chris Anderson as executive vice-chairman and Managing director on the next day. Ryan Kent was temporarily recalled back to Liverpool after a change in managers saw Jürgen Klopp take charge and on 18 November, Klopp revealed he was happy for Kent to resume his loan spell after believing he was at the right place. A further two loan signings was made with Newcastle United midfielder Gaël Bigirimana and Cardiff City defender Ben Turner returning to the club until 3 January 2016 after signing on 16 November and 18 November. It was announced on 19 November that Joe Cole will be staying at the Ricoh Arena until 3 January after a loan extension. Yeovil Town extended their loan deal for George Thomas, meaning he will remain at the club till January. On 22 November, Jacob Murphy became only the second-ever player to score a hat-tick at the Ricoh Arena. Coventry had another undefeated month in the league meaning the Sky Blues were unbeaten in their last eleven matches, the best run at the club since 1967. This meant that the club ended the month in first place with three wins and two draws in November. However, Coventry City were defeated when they were knocked out the FA Cup in the first round after a home defeat to Northampton Town on 7 November.

Competitions

Preseason friendlies
On 7 May 2015, Coventry City announced their first pre-season friendly away to Luton Town on 25 July 2015. On 18 May 2015, Coventry City announced a pre-season friendly against Oxford United on 1 August 2015. On 21 May 2015, Coventry City announced their third pre-season friendly against Cambridge United. On 1 June 2015, a friendly against Nuneaton Town was confirmed for 11 July 2015. On 3 July 2015, it was revealed that Coventry City's fixture against Oxford United will be played at Liberty Way as Oxford United want to make sure that their pitch is at the highest quality for the start of the season. A fixture against Portsmouth was announced on 11 July 2015, which will take place at Havant and Waterlooville's West Leigh Park. On 22 July 2015, the Sky Blues announced a XI side will face Leamington on 29 July 2015.

League One

On 17 June 2015, the fixtures for the forthcoming season were announced.

League table

Results summary

Results by matchday

Fixtures

FA Cup

Coventry City will begin their FA Cup campaign in the first round with ties being played on 6 November 2015 to 9 November 2015.

League Cup

On 16 June 2015, the first round draw was made, Coventry City were drawn away against Rochdale. On 11 August 2015, the fixture was played at Spotland with Coventry City exiting the competition on penalties.

Football League Trophy

Coventry City will play in Southern Section of the competition. Their first match of the Football League Trophy will be during the week commencing 5 October after receiving a bye, which means they automatically qualify for the second round, where they will play away at Yeovil Town.

Birmingham Senior Cup
On the Birmingham FA website the first round details of the Birmingham Senior Cup were announced, with Coventry City to face Stratford Town.

Squad information

Squad details

* Player age and appearances/goals for the club as of beginning of 2015–16 season.

Appearances
Correct as of match played on 8 May 2016

Goalscorers
Correct as of match played on 8 May 2016

Assists
Correct as of match played on 8 May 2016

Yellow cards
Correct as of match played on 8 May 2016

Red cards
Correct as of match played on 8 May 2016

Captains
Correct as of match played on 8 May 2016

Penalties awarded

Suspensions served

Hat-tricks

Monthly & weekly awards

End-of-season awards

Transfers

Transfers in

Transfers out

Loans in

Loans out

Trials

References

External links
 Official Site: 2015–16
 BBC Sport – Club Stats
 Soccerbase – Results | Squad Stats | Transfers

Coventry City
Coventry City F.C. seasons